Liebfrauenmünster in Wolframs-Eschenbach is a church in Wolframs-Eschenbach, Bavaria, Germany. It was built in 1310.
The altar of the Rosary in the church was made in 1510 probably by disciples of Veit Stoß.

Notes

Buildings and structures completed in 1310
14th-century Roman Catholic church buildings in Germany
Wolframs-Eschenbach